Mary Morten, a lifelong activist in Chicago, has dedicated her voice to advocate for marginalized communities.
Morten was inducted into the Chicago Gay and Lesbian Hall of Fame in 1996. Morten served as the first African-American president of the Chicago chapter of the National Organization for Women, is an author and filmmaker on African-American lesbian experiences, and has led organizations such as the Chicago Abortion Fund and Chicago Foundation for Women. Of note, Morten directed the City of Chicago's Advisory Council on Gay and Lesbian issues in 1996.

History
Morten attributes her work as an activist to her mother, who believed in the civil rights era's Call to Action: If you aren't part of the solution, you're part of the problem. Notable in Morten's activist career is her volunteer role in Geraldine Ferraro's 1984 vice-presidential campaign. During that time, Morten walked into the local chapter of the National Organization for Women (NOW) and noted the lack of women of color present, and decided that had to change. "I walked in and never left," said Morten. Morten eventually became president of NOW and since led groups including the Women's Self-Employment Project and Chicago Abortion Fund.

In 1996, Morten became a member of A Real Read, a Chicago's African American Lesbigaytrans Performance Ensemble. This theatre company aimed to represent a community living under the dual minority status related to race and sexual orientation. A Real Read addressed issues such as: HIV and AIDS prevention, homophobia, religion, women and transgender issues. Through their poetry, prose, music, and vignettes, the group gave a voice to a community often silenced, while offering performances that reflected the universal.

In her role at the Mayor's office, Morten led the community-based coalition for the film, It's Elementary, an educational film for use in staff development trainings for Chicago Public Schools and developed the anti-racism project, The Color Triangle, for the LGBT community. In addition, Morten helped to found the Illinois Safe Schools Alliance and is a former board member of Chicago's Center on Halsted and of the National Gay and Lesbian Task Force.

In 2000, Mary Morten was named director of anti-violence prevention office for the Chicago Department of Public Health (CDPH). Morten coordinated CDPH's citywide violence prevention efforts and was responsible for the implementation of Prevent Violence! Chicago, the city's strategic violence prevention plan.

Beginning in 2007, Morten served as associate and interim executive director for the Chicago Foundation for Women.
Morten has worked with Barack Obama since he was a state senator in the late 1990s."Barack is totally comfortable with gay people...he mentioned gays in his announcement speech in Springfield, I11., which he didn't have to do. But it's not just a media opportunity with him. He is part of the community.".

Mary Morten also worked on Obama's presidential campaign  and is a regular visitor to the Obama White House. When the White House hosted a reception to celebrate Gay Pride month in 2009, Morten was part of the Chicago entourage that celebrated with the President and First Lady.

Current work
Currently, Morten is the president of Morten Group, through which Mary Morten specializes in social change through skills development, public policy and advocacy for the betterment of women, people of color and the LGBT community 

Morten is also currently producing a documentary inspired by the research of Cathy Cohen's work with the Black Youth Project, at the University of Chicago. The film is titled, "Woke Up Black" and explores the attitudes, actions, and decisions of African-American youth.  Of this documentary she is producing, Morten says "I think the media is a powerful tool that is an under tapped resource. Anytime we can talk about issues, whether we're doing an interview on the radio, filming a documentary or using radio to make a presentation to policy makers, I think that we tell the story in a much more compelling way and I think many more people will hear it. I think that most of my goals will focus on media work."

References

External links
Morten Group
Chicago Foundation for Women

Living people
African-American film directors
People from Chicago
Year of birth missing (living people)
American LGBT rights activists
African-American women writers
African-American writers
African-American activists
Film directors from Illinois
Women civil rights activists
21st-century African-American people
21st-century African-American women